Albertina Carri (born 1973, Buenos Aires) is an Argentine film producer, screenwriter and director, as well as an audiovisual artist.

Biography 
Albertina Carri was born in Buenos Aires in 1973, where she currently lives and works. She is the daughter of Ana María Caruso and Roberto Carri, both abducted during the last military dictatorship in Argentina.

She has a son, Furio Carri Dillon Ros, registered in Argentina using a so-called triple filiation; he is son of a father, Alejandro Ros and two mothers, Albertina Carri and Marta Dillon.

The Carri Dillon couple dissolved in 2015. They are divorced.

She filmed her first movie, No quiero volver a casa, at age 24. This work was selected later for the Rotterdam, London and Vienna film festivals.

Her foray into animation techniques resulted in the short movies Aurora and Barbie también puede estar triste, (which is a pornographic short animation). This last short won the Best Foreign Film award in the New York Mix Festival.

Her second feature film, Los Rubios, put her amongst the best directors of her age. Los Rubios was released in United States and Spain after being shown in the Locarno, Toronto, Gijón, Rotterdam and Göteborg film festivals, and received the following awards: Del Público and Mejor Película Argentina in the BAFICI, Mejor Nuevo Director in Las Palmas and Mejor Película in L’alternative, in Barcelona. She also won three Clarín Awards: Mejor Actriz, Mejor Documental and Mejor Música. This movie, according to Julián Gorodischer, can be defined "as a reality show about the Memory". Also, it can be defined as a film that marked a turning point in the way victims of the Dirty War are represented in the media.

Géminis, her third feature film, was presented in the Director's Fortnightof Cannes Film Festival and was commercially released worldwide in 2005.

Her 2008 feature film, La Rabia, has been awarded with two FIPRESCI Awards in Havana and Transylvania, with the distinctions of Best Director in the Havana Film Festival and both Best Director and Best Actress in Monterrey Film Festival.

In 2009, she won the achievement award Luna de Valencia, in the Cinema Jove Festival, on Valencia.

In 2010, she created, along with journalist Marta Dillon, the TV production company Torta, through which she made the TV series Visibles, La Bella Tarea and 23 Pares.

During 2011, Carri has developed Partes de Lengua for the Language and Book Museum (Museo del Libro y de la Lengua); it's an artistic work about the mother tongue being a result of the historic process of conquest and the problems aborigin languages and oral and written tradition face in the Argentine territory as they struggle to survive.

In 2015, Carri staged the exhibition Operación fracaso y el sonido recobrado in the Parque de la Memoria de Buenos Aires; this exhibition consisted in five video installments with different formats: audible, sculptural and visual, forming an intimate and reflective corpus about the multiple ways of evocating memoria, with the intention of making a sensitive experience of the memories of the traumatic events suffered by the victims of dirty war.

Since 2013, Carri is the artistic director of Asterisco, an international LGBTIQ film festival that lasts a week and is held in Buenos Aires.

Filmography

Director 
 2000: No quiero volver a casa (I Don't Want to Go Home)
 2001: Excursiones (short film)
 2001: Aurora (short film)
 2001: Historias de Argentina en vivo (Live Stories of Argentina) (short film)
 2001: Barbie también puede estar triste (Barbie Can Be Sad Too) (short film)
 2003: Los rubios
 2003: Fama (short film)
 2004: De vuelta (Returned) (short film)
 2005: Géminis
 2007: Urgente
 2008: La rabia
 2018: Las Hijas Del Fuego (The Daughters of Fire)

Writer 
 2000: No quiero volver a casa
 2001: Barbie también puede estar triste (short film)
 2003: Fama (short film)
 2003: Los rubios
 2005: Géminis
 2007: Urgente
 2008: La rabia

Producer 
 2000: No quiero volver a casa
 2001: Barbie también puede estar triste (short film)
 2003: Los rubios

Technical equipment

Camera 
 2000: No quiero volver a casa
 2003: Los rubios

Editor 
 2001: Aurora (short film)

Camera assistant 
 1993: De eso no se habla
 1998: Silvia Prieto

Books 

 2007: Los Rubios: cartografía de una película

TV series 

 2012: 23 pares.
 2014: La bella tarea.

Notes

References

1973 births
Living people
Argentine film directors
Argentine screenwriters
Argentine women writers
Argentine women film directors
Writers from Buenos Aires
Argentine LGBT screenwriters
Argentine actresses
Argentine lesbian writers
Lesbian actresses
Lesbian screenwriters
Date of birth missing (living people)
Children of people disappeared during Dirty War
21st-century Argentine LGBT people